Fairplay Township is one of fifteen townships in Greene County, Indiana, USA.  As of the 2010 census, its population was 575.

Geography
The stream of Lattas Creek runs through this township.

Cities and towns
 Switz City (east quarter)

Unincorporated towns
 Dixon
 Elliston
(This list is based on USGS data and may include former settlements.)

Adjacent townships
 Jefferson Township (north)
 Highland Township (northeast)
 Richland Township (east)
 Taylor Township (southeast)
 Washington Township (southwest)
 Grant Township (west)
 Smith Township (northwest)

Cemeteries
The township contains one cemetery, Castle Hill.

Major highways

Airports and landing strips
 Shawnee Field

Notable natives
Martin Wines, state representative

References
 
 United States Census Bureau cartographic boundary files

External links
 Indiana Township Association
 United Township Association of Indiana

Townships in Greene County, Indiana
Bloomington metropolitan area, Indiana
Townships in Indiana